Michele Magnoni (born 18 July 1988) is a motorcycle racer from Italy, he competed in the FIM Superstock 1000 Cup in 2010.

References

FIM Superstock 1000 Cup riders
1988 births
Living people
Italian motorcycle racers
Place of birth missing (living people)